is a train station in Kushiro Town, Hokkaidō, Japan.

Lines
Hokkaido Railway Company
Senmō Main Line Station B56

Adjacent stations

Stations of Hokkaido Railway Company
Railway stations in Hokkaido Prefecture
Railway stations in Japan opened in 1988